Jost Metzler (26 February 1909 – 29 September 1975) was a German submarine commander during World War II.

Career
Metzler joined the Kriegsmarine in October 1933, after spending eight years in the merchant marine. He served on the torpedo boat T-196 and on several minesweepers. After 13 patrols on the minesweeper Grille, he transferred to the U-boat arm in April 1940, commissioning  in November 1940.

Metzler's third patrol on U-69 was the most successful. He laid 16 mines in the harbour of Lagos, Nigeria, where they later sank a British steamer.
 
Metzler developed renal colic a few days after leaving St. Nazaire on his fourth patrol in August 1941, forcing the U-boat to return to port. After two months in hospital he served as the leading training officer in 25th and 27th U-boat Flotilla until February 1943.

Metzler commanded  from February to June 1943 without sailing on any patrols, and was appointed temporary locum commander of 5th U-boat Flotilla for two months before serving as commander of 19th U-boat Flotilla from October 1943 until the end of war.

In 1954 Metzler published a memoir The Laughing Cow: The Story of U-69. The title is derived from the time when U-69 was first assigned to 7th U-boat Flotilla and the crew were instructed to paint Günther Prien's snorting bull insignia on the U-boat's conning tower. No illustration was enclosed, so U-69s First Watch Officer, Oberleutnant zur See Hans-Jürgen Auffermann instructed a shipyard worker to copy the head of laughing cow which appeared on the packaging of a popular French dairy product instead. This naturally proved to be a source of great amusement.

Awards
 Wehrmacht Long Service Award 4th Class (1 June 1936)
 Sudetenland Medal (20 December 1939)
 Iron Cross (1939)
 2nd Class (21 December 1939)
 1st Class (2 March 1941)
 U-boat War Badge (1939) (12 April 1941)
 Knight's Cross of the Iron Cross on 28 July 1941 as Kapitänleutnant and commander of U-69

References

Notes

Bibliography

External links

1909 births
1975 deaths
U-boat commanders (Kriegsmarine)
Recipients of the Knight's Cross of the Iron Cross
Reichsmarine personnel
Military personnel from Baden-Württemberg
People from Altshausen